Byron Center is an unincorporated community and census-designated place (CDP) in Kent County in the U.S. state of Michigan.  The population was 7,431 at the 2020 census, which is a significant increase from a population of 5,822 at the 2010 census.  Byron Center is located within Byron Township.

As an unincorporated community, Byron Center has no legal autonomy of its own but has its own post office with the 49315 ZIP Code, which serves a much larger area within several surrounding townships.

Geography

Demographics

2010 census
As of the 2010 census Byron Center had a population of 5,822. The population was 93.7% non-Hispanic white, 0.9% African-American, 0.4% Native American, 1.0% Asian, 0.1% non-Hispanics of some other race, 1.4% reporting two or more races and 2.7% Hispanic.

2000 census
As of the census of 2000, there were 3,777 people, 1,322 households, and 1,040 families residing in Byron Center. The racial makeup of the CDP was 97.93% White, 0.11% African American, 0.19% Native American, 0.61% Asian, 0.03% Pacific Islander, 0.21% from other races, and 0.93% from two or more races. Hispanic or Latino of any race were 0.95% of the population.

There were 1,322 households, out of which 43.6% had children under the age of 18 living with them, 69.5% were married couples living together, 7.3% had a female householder with no husband present, and 21.3% were non-families. 19.4% of all households were made up of individuals, and 9.6% had someone living alone who was 65 years of age or older.  The average household size was 2.82 and the average family size was 3.26.

Around 32.5% of Byron Center residents were under the age of 18, 6.5% from 18 to 24, 30.6% from 25 to 44, 18.9% from 45 to 64, and 11.5% were 65 years of age or older.  The median age was 34 years. For every 100 females, there were 90.6 males.  For every 100 females age 18 and over, there were 89.0 males.

The median income for a household in Byron Center was $58,508, and the median income for a family was $65,882. Males had a median income of $50,517 versus $28,043 for females. The per capita income was $29,028.  About 1.9% of families and 3.2% of the population were below the poverty line, including 6.7% of those age 65 or over.

References

External links

Byron Township official website
Byron Center Museum

Unincorporated communities in Kent County, Michigan
Census-designated places in Michigan
Grand Rapids metropolitan area
Unincorporated communities in Michigan
Census-designated places in Kent County, Michigan